Lisala is the capital of the Mongala Province in northwestern Democratic Republic of the Congo.
 
The Congo River flows through the city. Its Cathédrale Saint-Hermès is the cathedral episcopal see of the Roman Catholic Diocese of Lisala. It is the birthplace of president Mobutu Sese Seko, who ruled Congo (which he renamed Zaire) from 1965 to 1997.

The population is made up of several different tribal groups, notably Ngombe with minorities of Mongo, Ngandi, Ngwaka and Budja.

The area is crossed by the N6 road, of the Route Nationale and is bordered to the north by the Mongala River and to the south by the Congo River.

References

External links

Populated places in Mongala
Mobutu Sese Seko